Lee Seung-chul (born December 5, 1966) is a South Korean singer best known for the hit songs, "My Love", "Never Ending Story", and "Girls' Generation". Currently an artist of Kakao Entertainment's label Flex M, he debuted in 1985 as the vocalist of the rock band Boohwal, which he left in 1989 to release his first solo album, Don't Say Good-Bye. He has released 12 Korean studio albums in total. He is also active in Japan, where he is known by the stage name Rui.

Lee has won several major awards, including the Album Bonsang at the 1989, 2004, and 2009 Golden Disc Awards; and Musician of the Year (Male) at the 2005 Korean Music Awards.

Discography

Studio albums

Live albums

Best albums

Other albums

Video albums

Filmography

Movies

Television  show

Awards and nominations

References

External links 

 Official website (Korean)
 

1966 births
K-pop singers
Living people
South Korean Christians
South Korean male film actors
South Korean male singers
South Korean pop rock singers
South Korean television personalities
Converts to Christianity from Buddhism
Universal Music Japan artists
Korean Music Award winners
Melon Music Award winners